The Palatine Ludwig Railway Company (Pfälzische Ludwigsbahn-Gesellschaft) was a German railway concern that was founded to operate the Palatine Ludwig Railway (Ludwigsbahn) in the Palatinate, a region of southwest Germany that was once part of the Kingdom of Bavaria within the German Empire.

On 1 January 1870, the Palatine Ludwig Railway Company, the Palatine Maximilian Railway Company and the Palatine Northern Railway (with which the Neustadt-Dürkheim Railway Company had amalgamated) had formed a management and operational association under the name "United Palatine Railways" (Vereinigte Pfälzische Eisenbahnen) or Palatinate Railway (Pfalzbahn) for short, with its headquarters in Ludwigshafen. Nevertheless, Palatine Ludwig Railway was responsible for the subsequent opening of the following railway lines:

 Ludwigshafen–Frankenthal–Bobenheim, on 15 November 1853
 Speyer–Germersheim, on 14 March 1864
 Speyer–Rhein station – towards Schwetzingen, on 10 December 1873
 Landau–Annweiler, on 12 September 1874
 Annweiler–Biebermühle–Zweibrücken, (Queich Valley Railway) and
 Biebermühle–Pirmasens, on 25 November 1875
 Einöd–Bierbach–Reinheim–Saargemünd, on 1 April 1879 (Blies valley line)
 Biebermühle–Waldfischbach, on 1 June 1904 (Biebermühl Railway)

In addition the following narrow gauge routes belonging to the Palatine Ludwig Railway should be mentioned:
 Ludwigshafen–Dannstadt, and Ludwigshafen–Frankenthal, on 15 October 1890
 Frankenthal–Großkarlbach, 13 km, on 1 July 1891
 Speyer Lokalbahnhof–Geinsheim, on 26 August 1905 (Pfefferminzbähnel/Gäubähnel)
 Geinsheim–Neustadt branch line station, on 31 October 1908 (Pfefferminzbähnel/Gäubähnel)

On 1 January 1909, the Ludwigsbahn was transferred into the ownership of the Royal Bavarian State Railways along with the other companies belonging to the Palatinate Railway.

See also
History of rail transport in Germany
Royal Bavarian State Railways
List of Palatine locomotives and railbuses

Defunct railway companies of Germany
Transport in Rhineland-Palatinate